Working Class Hero: The Definitive Lennon is a two-disc compilation of music by John Lennon, released in October 2005 on Capitol Records, catalogue CDP 0946 3 40391 2 3, in commemoration of what would have been his 65th birthday. The set contains remixed and remastered versions of his songs, overseen by widow Yoko Ono from 2000 to 2005.

Overview
The 38 assembled tracks span his entire solo career, and contain every Lennon song released as a single with the exception of the posthumous "Every Man Has a Woman Who Loves Him", although not always the version or edit originally released as such. Representative tracks appear from all of his eight studio albums issued from 1970 to 1984, and the set contains all the songs featured on the previously released compilations Shaved Fish and Lennon Legend and all but one from The John Lennon Collection (Dear Yoko; "Move Over Ms. L," which was issued as a bonus track on the 1989 CD edition was also omitted), albeit at times in slightly different form. The bonus DVD included in Working Class Hero Deluxe Pack issued by EMI on 23 October 2008, is actually the Lennon Legend DVD.

Reception
Working Class Hero: The Definitive Lennon was critically well-received upon its release and reached number 11 in the United Kingdom. It fared relatively poorly in the United States, debuting on the Billboard 200 album chart on 22 October at number 135, spending only three weeks on the chart.

Track listing

Disc 1 and 2

Charts

Certifications

}

}
}

References

2005 greatest hits albums
Compilation albums published posthumously
Albums produced by Jack Douglas (record producer)
John Lennon compilation albums
Parlophone compilation albums